Julia Lang may refer to:

 Julia Lang (fashion entrepreneur) (born 1989), German Tanzanian creative director and serial entrepreneur 
 Julia (programming language), programming language whose website has a similar name (JuliaLang.org)
 Julia Lang (actress) (1921–2010), British film and radio actress and radio presenter
 Júlia Láng (born 2003), Hungarian figure skater